Ambatondrazaka District is a district in the Alaotra-Mangoro Region of Madagascar. Its capital is the town of Ambatondrazaka.

Geography 
The city is situated south of Alaotra, the greatest lake in Madagascar.

Religion
 FJKM - Fiangonan'i Jesoa Kristy eto Madagasikara (Church of Jesus Christ in Madagascar)
 FLM - Fiangonana Loterana Malagasy (Malagasy Lutheran Church)
 Roman Catholic Diocese of Ambatondrazaka (Cathedral of the Holy Trinity).

Transport 
The district is linked to Moramanga by the MLA (Moramanga–Lac Alaotra) railway and the Route nationale 44 (Moramanga–Ambatondrazaka–Imerimandroso–Amboavory). There is also an airport in Ambatondrazaka.

Communes
The district is further divided into 20 communes:

 Ambandrika
 Ambatondrazaka Suburbaine
 Ambatondrazaka
 Ambatosoratra
 Ambohitsilaozana
 Amparihitsokatra
 Ampitatsimo
 Andilanatoby
 Andromba
 Antanandava
 Antsangasanga
 Bejofo
 Didy
 Feramanga Nord
 Ilafy
 Imerimandroso
 Manakambahiny Est
 Manakambahiny Ouest
 Soalazaina
 Tanambao Besakay

References

Districts of Alaotra-Mangoro